The Mahi are a people of Benin. They live north of Abomey, from the Togo border on the west to the Zou River on the east, and south to Cové between the Zou and Ouemé rivers, north of the Dassa hills.

The Mahi established their own kingdom before 1800 years ago, and were a target of the Slave trade before French colonization at the end of the 19th century.

See also
 Rulers of the Mahi state of Fitta
 Rulers of the Mahi state of Savalu

Sources
 
 
 
 
 
 
 

Ethnic groups in Benin